Maijbagh Union (alternate spelling Maijbag) is a union parishad under Ishwarganj Upazila of Mymensingh District in the division of Mymensingh, Bangladesh. It has an area of 29.71 square kilometres and a population of 38848.

Geography
Maijbagh Union is bounded on the east by Jatia Union, on the west by Barahit Union, on the south by Magtula Union and Nandail Upazila and on the north by Ishwarganj Union.

Demographics 
The union has a total area of 29.71 km2 and a total of 27 villages. According to the Bangladesh National Portal, a total population of 38,848 lives in 7,150 households, of which males and females number 19,704 and 18,692 respectively. According to the census report of the National Bureau of Statistics of Bangladesh, the number of males and females in 2001 was 18,620 and 17,874 respectively.

Places of interest 

 Kumuria Bill
 Andar Dighighat

References

Unions of Ishwarganj Upazila